The Private Sector Survey on Cost Control (PSSCC), commonly referred to as the Grace Commission, was an investigation requested by United States President Ronald Reagan, authorized in  on June 30, 1982. In doing so President Reagan used the now famous phrase, "Drain the swamp".   The focus was waste and inefficiency in the US Federal government. Its head, businessman J. Peter Grace, asked the members of that commission to "Be bold and work like tireless bloodhounds, don't leave any stone unturned in your search to root out inefficiency."

Report

The Grace Commission report was presented to Congress in January 1984. The report was in depth and showed that if its recommendations were followed, $424 billion could be saved in three years, rising to $1.9 trillion per year by the year 2000. It estimated that the national debt, without these reforms, would rise to $13 trillion by the year 2000, while with the reforms they projected it would rise to only $2.5 trillion. The report's recommendations that intruded into policy were ignored by Congress, but many other efficiency recommendations were considered and some were implemented.

The US national debt reached $5.6 trillion in the year 2000 and reached 13 trillion in 2010 after the subprime mortgage-collateralized debt obligation crisis in 2008.

The report said that one-third of all income taxes are consumed by waste and inefficiency in the federal government, and another one-third escapes collection owing to the underground economy. "With two thirds of everyone's personal income taxes wasted or not collected, 100 percent of what is collected is absorbed solely by interest on the federal debt and by federal government contributions to transfer payments. In other words, all individual income tax revenues are gone before one nickel is spent on the services that taxpayers expect from their government."

See also
 National debt
 Federal Reserve System
 Public administration
 Public administration theory

Other similar commissions
 Brownlow Committee 1937
 Hoover Commission two commissions, in 1947–1949 and 1953–1955.
 National Partnership for Reinventing Government 1993–1998

References

Literature

External links
 Grace Commission List The formal title is President's Private Sector Survey and called PPSS

Presidency of Ronald Reagan
1980s in the United States
Publications of the United States government
United States Presidential Commissions